Michael Anthony Charles Slemen (11 May 1951 – 20 July 2020) was an  international rugby union player. He toured South Africa in 1980 with the British and Irish Lions and at the time played club rugby for Liverpool.

Early life
Mike Slemen was born on 11 May 1951 in Liverpool, and educated at St Edward's College, Liverpool.

Rugby union career
Slemen made his international debut on 6 March 1976 at Twickenham in the England vs Ireland match. Of the 32 matches he played for his national side he was on the winning side on 15 occasions. He played his final match for England on 4 February 1984 at Murrayfield in the Scotland vs England match. He also played for a World XV on 9 August 1980 against  in Buenos Aires, losing 36–22.

Career and later life
He taught Physical Education (part-time) at the Merchant Taylors' School, Crosby and was also the expedition leader of the Duke of Edinburgh Award.

Personal life
Slemen was married to Eileen.

He died on 20 July 2020, aged 69.

References

1951 births
2020 deaths
British & Irish Lions rugby union players from England
England international rugby union players
English rugby union players
Lancashire County RFU players
Liverpool St Helens F.C. players
North of England Rugby Union team
People educated at St Edward's College
Rugby union players from Liverpool
Rugby union wings